Cruciani is an Italian surname. Notable people with the surname include:

Andrés Cruciani (born 1966), Argentine footballer and manager
Enrico Cruciani Alibrandi (1839–1921), Italian politician
Giuseppe Cruciani (born 1966), Italian radio presenter, television presenter and journalist
Michele Cruciani (born 1986), Italian footballer
Paola Tiziana Cruciani (born 1958), Italian actress, comedian and playwright

Italian-language surnames